The Sultan Qaboos University Library is the legal deposit and copyright library for Oman. It is part of the campus of the Sultan Qaboos University.

References

External links
Official website

Year of establishment missing
Buildings and structures in Muscat, Oman
Libraries in Oman
National libraries
Sultan Qaboos University